Embark Bouchaib El-Maachi (1943 – before 1998) was a Moroccan sprinter. He competed in the 100 metres at the 1960 Summer Olympics and the 1964 Summer Olympics.

References

1943 births
Year of death missing
Athletes (track and field) at the 1960 Summer Olympics
Athletes (track and field) at the 1964 Summer Olympics
Moroccan male sprinters
Olympic athletes of Morocco
People from Azemmour